Sir Anthony (James) Williams  (28 May 1923 – 7 May 1990) was a British diplomat.

He attended Oundle School and Trinity College, Oxford, where he read Philosophy, politics and economics. He joined the Foreign Office in 1945. He served several overseas posts including being stationed in the UN offices in Geneva and New York, and was present in Egypt during the Suez Crisis in 1956.

He was Ambassador to Cambodia from 1970 to 1973, and then after a in Rome as Minister. He became Ambassador to Libya from 1977 to 1980, and Ambassador to Argentina from 1980 to 1982; his term in Argentina was disrupted by the Falklands War. During his retirement, he served as President of the Society for Libyan Studies.

Williams was grandson of the chancery lawyer Lord Wrenbury and nephew of Sir Denys Burton Buckley. He married on 11 April 1955 in Cairo to German noblewoman Countess Hedwig von Neipperg (born 1929), daughter of Count Erwin von Neipperg and his wife, Countess Hissa von Hatzfeldt zu Trachenberg. They had four children.

References

Ambassadors of the United Kingdom to Cambodia
Ambassadors of the United Kingdom to Libya
Ambassadors of the United Kingdom to Argentina
Alumni of Trinity College, Oxford
Knights Commander of the Order of St Michael and St George
1923 births
1990 deaths
British expatriates in the United States
British expatriates in Switzerland
British expatriates in Egypt